Stag was a barque built in  Nova Scotia which was renowned for her speed.  Designed by a pioneering Canadian naval architect Ebenezer Moseley, Stag was built with a dramatic "Aberdeen bow".  Considered an Atlantic Canadian example of a Clipper Ship, she was famous for several fast passages, despite her small size, and was painted by the famous Nova Scotian ship portrait artist John O'Brien.

References
Sailing Ships of the Maritime Charles Armour and Thomas Lackey (Toronto: McGraw-Hill Ryerson, 1975)

External links
 Tall Ships of Atlantic Canada – Registry Information
Tall Ships of Atlantic Canada – Ship Portrait 
Parks Canada Ship Information Database - Registry Information

Maritime history of Canada
Tall ships of Canada
Individual sailing vessels
Ships built in Nova Scotia
Victorian-era merchant ships of Canada
Sailing ships of Canada
Clippers